Huws Gray is a British builders merchants chain based in the town of Llangefni, Anglesey, Wales. Huws Gray has over 100 branches located across Wales, England and Scotland and most recently with the acquisition of the Buildbase, PDM Scotland and Civils and lintels.

History
The business was founded in 1990 on Anglesey with 4 employees. Today, Huws Gray employs almost 800 employees across its branch network. In 2017 the company added its 60th branch 
In July 2021 the company agreed to purchase the merchanting business of Grafton Group in a deal worth £520m. The sale was completed in January 2022. In November 2021, backed by US private equity firm Blackstone, Huws Gray has acquired Swansea city center-based builders and timber merchant Exall & Jones Ltd.

Sponsorship
The company sponsor the Cymru Alliance league, the second tier of the Welsh football in north and mid Wales, and the league is now known as the Huws Gray Alliance. They were also the main sponsors of the 2019 Inter Games Football Tournament held between the Island Games teams on Anglesey.

Notes

External links 
Huws Gray
Huws Gray Alliance

Organisations based in Anglesey
1990 establishments in Wales
Retail companies of Wales